Sweet Little Lies is a 2012 Romanian comedy film directed by Iura Luncasu.

Cast 
 Diana Dumitrescu as Dana
 Andi Vasluianu as Dani
 Antoaneta Zaharia as Oana 
 Marius Damian as Toni
 Loredana Groza as Yvonne

References

External links 

2012 comedy films
2012 films
Romanian comedy films